is a syllabogram in Javanese script that represents the sounds /sɔ/ and /sa/. It is transliterated to Latin as "sa", and sometimes in Indonesian orthography as "so".

Pasangan 
Its pasangan form , is one of six pasangan that are placed on the right-hand side of the previous syllable. Therefore, it is permissible to write two pasangan at the same time without having to resort to pangkon (꧀).

The location of the sandhangan ꦶ, ꦼ, or ꦁ is on top the pasangan, not on the previous syllable. (See glyph table below)

Extended form 
The letter ꦱ has a murda form, which is ꦯ.

Using cecak telu, the syllable represents /ʃa/.

Mahaprana
Mahaprana letters were originally aspirated consonants used in Sanskrit and Kawi transliterations. However, there are no aspirated consonants in modern Javanese.

Glyphs

Unicode block 

Javanese script was added to the Unicode Standard in October, 2009 with the release of version 5.2.

References 

Javanese script